Saint Stanislav Nasadil (October 20 1907, Lostice - June 28 1941, Jadovno concentration camp) was a Czech Serbian Orthodox Church priest, a martyr in World War II.

Life 
Born on 20 October 1907 in Loštice, Austrian Empire as the son of the father František Nasadil and his mother Františka. He had four brothers. He first attended a national school and then a burgher school. In 1921 and 1922, the family renounced the Catholic faith, and in 1924 they joined the newly emerging Orthodox Church under the leadership of the Bishop Gorazda.

As a young man, he decided on a Christian vocation. Together with 14 students, he was sent to a seminary of the Serbian Orthodox Church in 1923. He first studied in the seminar of St. Jan Theologian in Macedonian Bitole and in 1928 he finished his studies with a theological school-leaving examination in the seminary of St. Sava. Then he returned home and started working in the service of the church and also as a translator in Baťa's shoe factories in Zlín.

On 6 July 1931, he married Leopoldina b. Pestlová (Desanka) and the same year their son Dalibor called Stanko was born.

Between 1932 and 1933 he left for the Kingdom of Yugoslavia. On March 11, 1933, he was ordained a deacon bishop by the Diocese of Bac Irinej and a day later on jerej. After his ordination, he began working as an auxiliary priest in the parish of Stara Moravica belonging to the Diocese of Upper Carlovac. He then became a parish priest in Croatian Lička Jesenica in the church of St. the prophet Elijah.

In April 1941, Croatian and Bosnian territories were occupied by nazist Independent State of Croatia was established there, which was a puppet country of the Third Reich. This Ustasha state liquidated religious minorities (Orthodox Serbs, Roma, and Jews). On May 23, 1941, the Ustashas invaded the residence of the eparchial bishop Sáva in the village of Plaški. The bishop and the clergy present, including Father Stanislav, were identified as undesirable and were called to leave the country under threat of death. Those present decided to stay with their believers.

On June 17, 1941, Bishop Sava, Father Stanislav, and other clergy and laity were arrested. Father Stanislav refused to defend Czechoslovak citizenship and dismiss his family. At the train station, he managed to write the name of the Gospić concentration camp on a piece of paper and threw it off the train. This way the family learned where they were transporting him. He was later transferred with Bishop Sava and others to the Jadovno concentration camp. Here the prisoners were tortured and eventually killed. Stanislav Nasadil was killed after  torture on June 28, 1941, and his body was thrown into the Šaran pit, located about 1 km from the camp.

On June 9, 2019, Father Stanislav was canonized by the Orthodox Church of the Czech Lands and Slovakia. The service took place in Cyril and Methodius in Michalovce.

References

Serbian saints of the Eastern Orthodox Church
1941 deaths
20th-century Eastern Orthodox martyrs
People from Čapljina
Czech saints
New Martyrs
Persecution of Serbs
People executed by the Independent State of Croatia
People murdered in the Independent State of Croatia
Czech people who died in the Holocaust
Yugoslav people who died in the Holocaust
Serbian people who died in the Holocaust
Deaths by blade weapons
1907 births